At-Takāthur ("Rivalry, Competition") is the 102nd chapter (sūrah) of the Qur'an, with 8 verses (āyāt). Regarding the timing and contextual background of the believed revelation (asbāb al-nuzūl), it is an earlier "Meccan surah", which means it is believed to have been revealed in Mecca, rather than later in Medina.

Summary
1-3 Men spend their time seeking the things of this world
3-5 The judgment-day shall reveal their folly
6-8 In consequence they shall see hell-fire

Text and transliteration

1 

2 

3 

4 

5 

6 

7 

8

Overview
After the bismillah, this Surah is concerned with factionalism and schism amongst people. Disagreements between individuals and groups follow us "even until you visit the tombs". Three times in a row the sura warns the reader that "you shall know" that those who sow discord are headed towards Hell. Here, proper understanding is required for entrance into Paradise, and should one not attain this on Earth, one will receive the "eye of certainty" on the Day of Judgment, when "you shall be questioned ... concerning true bliss".

Theme and subject matter
]
Nahj al-Balagha commentary on Al-Islam.org is quoted as:

Mention in ahadith
 It was narrated from Mutarrif, from his father, that the Prophet said: "The mutual rivalry (for piling up of worldly things) diverts you, 'Until you visit the graves (i.e. till you die).' The son of Adam says: 'My wealth, my wealth,' but your wealth is what you eat and consume, or what you wear and it wears out, or what you give in charity and send on ahead (for the Hereafter).'"

 Mutarrif bin Abdullah bin Ash-Shikh-khir reported from his father, : that he went to the Prophet and he was reciting: ‘أَلْهَاكُمُ التَّكَاثُرُ ’ He said: “The son of Adam says: ‘My wealth, my wealth.’ And do you own anything except what you give in charity, such that you’ve spent it, or what you eat, such that you’ve finished it, or you wear, such that you’ve worn it out?”

References

External links
Quran 102 Clear Quran translation

Takathur